The Tronja Mosque is a Tunisian mosque, located in the Tronja area, which is a part of the Bab Souika suburb, in the north of the medina of Tunis.

Localization 

The mosque is located at 13, Tronja Street.

Etymology  
According to the Andalusian geographer and historian Al-Bakri, the gardens surrounding the city of Tunis produced high quality citrons, known for their good taste and parfume. Therefore, this was the origin of the Tronja street's and the Old Tronja's names.

History 
The mosque was completely rebuilt by the municipality of Tunis in November 1983 - the year when the minaret was added - according to the commemorative plaque on the building. 
However, the original date of construction is not often mentioned in the literature.

See also

 Islam in Tunisia

References 

Mosques in Tunis